Talgarth railway station is a former railway station on the Mid-Wales Railway. It opened in 1864 and closed in 1962, serving the town of Talgarth in Powys, Wales.

History

Closure came on 31 December 1962 when all lines to Brecon including the Mid-Wales line were closed.

Present day
The original station buildings survive as private residence and the trackbed is now in use as part of the A479 road.

References

Disused railway stations in Powys
Railway stations in Great Britain opened in 1864
Railway stations in Great Britain closed in 1962
Former Cambrian Railway stations
Talgarth